Dumex is an infants' and children's nutrition company. Its products are growing-up milk and follow-on milk. Dumex is a part of Groupe Danone, which is headquartered in Paris, France.
Dumex products is one of the Danone Group, company of Danone Dumex is headquartered in France.

Until 2005, Dumex was a part of the East Asiatic Company.

Food and drink companies of France
Companies with year of establishment missing
Groupe Danone